
This is a list of players who graduated from the Nationwide Tour in 2003. The top 20 players on the Nationwide Tour's money list in 2003 earned their PGA Tour card for 2004.

*PGA Tour rookie for 2004.
#Carter received a battlefield promotion to the PGA Tour in 2003 by winning three tournaments on the Nationwide Tour in 2003. On the PGA Tour in 2003 he played eight tournaments, making two cuts with a best finish of T12.

T = Tied
Green background indicates the player retained his PGA Tour card for 2005 (won or finished inside the top 125).
Yellow background indicates the player did not retain his PGA Tour card for 2005, but retained conditional status (finished between 126–150).
Red background indicates the player did not retain his PGA Tour card for 2005 (finished outside the top 150).

Winners on the PGA Tour in 2004

Runners-up on the PGA Tour in 2004

See also
2003 PGA Tour Qualifying School graduates

References
Schedule
Money list
Player profiles

Korn Ferry Tour
PGA Tour
Nationwide Tour Graduates
Nationwide Tour Graduates